{{DISPLAYTITLE:C11H6O3}}
The molecular formula C11H6O3 (molar mass: 186.16 g/mol, exact mass: 186.0317 u) may refer to:

 Angelicin
 Furanochromone
 Psoralen, or psoralene